The Capricorn rabbit rat (Conilurus capricornensis) is an extinct species of rodent from Queensland, Australia. It was described as a new species in 2010 on the basis of Pleistocene and Holocene dental remains. The specific name refers to the Capricorn Caves in Queensland, one of the locations where remains were unearthed. Some of the subfossil material post-dates the European settlement of Australia, so the Capricorn rabbit rat is a modern extinction. Since there has not been a targeted survey for the Capricorn rabbit rat, there is a thin hope of its survival, although this is unlikely.

Description
The Capricorn rabbit rat is larger than other rabbit rat (Conilurus) species. Also, unique dental features distinguish it from the white-footed rabbit rat (Conilurus albipes) and the brush-tailed rabbit rat (Conilurus penicillatus).

See also
List of Australian species extinct in the Holocene
Lists of extinct species
Fauna of Australia
Threatened fauna of Australia
List of recently extinct mammals

References

Conilurus
Extinct rodents
Extinct mammals of Australia
Rodent extinctions since 1500
Mammals of Queensland
Rodents of Australia